Xylosandrus mancus, is a species of weevil found in Afrotropical and Oriental regions.

Distribution
It is native to Madagascar, Mauritania, Seychelles, Tanzania, China, India, Sri Lanka, Indonesia, Japan, Malaysian Peninsula, Philippines, Taiwan, Thailand and Vietnam.

Description
Body length of the female ranges from 2.9 to 3.3 mm. Body yellowish brown to brown. Elytra dark brown at apex and declivity. Antennae and legs are yellowish brown. Antennea with 5 funicular segments and obliquely truncate club. Pronotal vestiture is semi-appressed and with hairy setae. Pronotal base covered with a dense patch of short erect setae that resemble a pronotal-mesonotal mycangium. Pronotal disc is moderately punctate. Pronotum consists with lateral costa and not carinate. Protibiae with 5 socketed teeth, whereas mesotibiae with 11 and metatibiae with 12 socketed teeth. In elytra, discal striae and interstriae multiseriate are punctate. Declivital elytral face is steep and abruptly separated from disc. Margin of the elytral declivity with a carina or sometimes forms a rim of granules that extends beyond the seventh interstriae by making a circumdeclivital ring.

A polyphagous species, it is found in many plants.

Host plants

 Adenanthera pavonina
 Albizia
 Anacardium occidentale
 Aphanamixis rohituka
 Artocarpus dadah
 Brackenridgea hookeri
 Cassia fistula
 Cordia dichotoma
 Cordia myxa
 Dalbergia latifolia
 Dryobalanops aromatica
 Dryobalanops oblongifolia
 Gomphia serrata
 Grewia paniculata
 Hibiscus macrophyllus
 Hopea beccariana
 Hopea ferrea
 Hullettia dumosa
 Khaya senegalensis
 Litsea megacarpa
 Mangifera indica
 Melanorrhoea 
 Nephelium lappaceum
 Palaquium gutta
 Pometia pinnata
 Quercus
 Shorea bracteolata
 Shorea leprosula
 Shorea macroptera
 Shorea sumatrana
 Styrax benzoin
 Swietenia macrophylla
 Swietenia mahagoni
 Tectona grandis
 Theobroma cacao
 Toona sureni
 Tristania whiteana
 Vateria copallifera
 Vitex pubescens

References 

Curculionidae
Insects of Sri Lanka
Beetles described in 1898